Community boards of Manhattan are New York City community boards in the borough of Manhattan, which are the appointed advisory groups of the community districts that advise on land use and zoning, participate in the city budget process, and address service delivery in their district.

Community boards each have up to 50 volunteer members appointed by the local borough president, half from nominations by City Council members representing the community district (i.e., whose council districts cover part of the community district). Additionally, all City Council members representing the community district are non-voting, ex officio board members.

History 
The 1963 revision of the New York City Charter extended the Borough of Manhattan's "Community Planning Councils" (est. 1951) to the outer boroughs as "Community Planning Boards", which are now known as "Community Boards".

The 1975 revision of the New York City Charter set the number of Community Districts/Boards to 59, established the position of the district manager for the community districts, and created the Uniform Land Use Review Procedure (ULURP) which gave the community boards the authority to review land use proposals such as zoning actions and special permits.

Community District 1 

Consists of neighborhoods:
 TriBeCa  
 Financial District, Manhattan
 Civic Center  - older name was Five Points
 Battery Park City 
 South Street Seaport 
 part of Chinatown 
 Battery Park 
 City Hall Park 
 Besides, there are three virtually uninhabited islands in the District. Their status is complicated by a number of political and historical factors:
 Ellis Island 
 Liberty Island
 Governors Island

Community District 2

Consists of neighborhoods:
 Greenwich Village Greenwich Village includes also:
 West Village
 South Village
 Washington Square Park
 NoHo
 SoHo
 SoHo, to its west, includes Hudson Square
 Little Italy
 part of Chinatown

Community District 3 

Consists of neighborhoods:
Lower East Side
East Village
Tompkins Square Park is located in East Village
Avenues A to D are sometimes known as Alphabet City
Chinatown
Two Bridges

Community District 4 

Consists of neighborhoods:
Hell's Kitchen (also called Clinton)
Chelsea

Sources:
NYC DCP Profile of Community District 4
Official website of Community Board 4

Community District 5 

Consists of neighborhoods:
Midtown
Times Square 
Herald Square 
Midtown South
Flatiron District
part of Murray Hill 
part of Chelsea
part of Gramercy
Union Square

Community District 6 

Consists of neighborhoods:
part of Murray Hill
Sutton Place
Beekman Place 
Turtle Bay 
Tudor City
part of Gramercy 
Kips Bay area is located inside Gramercy
Peter Cooper 
Stuyvesant Park
Stuyvesant Town
Bellevue Hospital Center and the United Nations headquarters are located in the District.

Community District 7 

Consists of one neighborhood:

Upper West Side including:
Central Park West Historic District 
Northern part of Upper West Side between West 96 Street and West 110 Street is known as Manhattan Valley or West Harlem''
Lincoln Square including Lincoln Center

Community District 8 

Consists of neighborhoods:

Yorkville 
Carl Schurz Park is located in Yorkville
Upper East Side 
Lenox Hill 
The following neighborhoods are located on the same named islands in East River.
Roosevelt Island 
Mill Rock

North-Western area of the District with South-Eastern boundary point at 3rd Avenue and East 86 Street is named Carnegie Hill

Community District 9 

Consists of neighborhoods:
Hamilton Heights 
Manhattanville
Morningside Heights
Columbia University

Community District 10 

Consists of the only neighborhood:
 Central Harlem

Polo Grounds is located in the District.

Community District 11 

Consists of only one neighborhood on Manhattan Island:
East Harlem
Sometimes it is named Spanish Harlem or El Barrio
Besides two neighborhoods, located on the same named islands are parts of the District:
Randall's Island
Wards Island
There is Mount Morris Park in the District.

Community District 12 

Consists of two neighborhoods:
Inwood
Washington Heights
Part of Washington Heights is known as Hudson Heights
Inwood Hill Park is located in the District.

Other areas 
Marble Hill, while legally a part of New York County ("Manhattan") is represented primarily by Bronx Community Board 8 and also by Bronx Community Board 7.

Within the borough of Manhattan there is one Joint Interest Area (JIA), which is outside of the jurisdiction of individual community districts, and have their own district number. The only JIA in New York county is:
 JIA 64 - Central Park, 2010 Census population: 25

Notable members 

 Anita Altman (Manhattan CB7)
 Shaun Abreu (Manhattan CB9)
 Brian Benjamin (Manhattan CB10)
 Gale Brewer (Manhattan CB7)
 Margaret Chin (Manhattan CB1 & CB3)
 Nick Fish (Manhattan CB5)
 Sylvia Friedman (Manhattan CB6)
 James F. Gennaro (Manhattan CB8)
 Robert Holden (politician) (Manhattan CB5)
 Corey Johnson (politician) (Manhattan CB4)
 Ben Kallos (Manhattan CB8)
 Carolyn Kent (Manhattan CB9)
 Julie Menin (Manhattan CB1)
 Keith Powers (Manhattan CB6)
 Dan Quart (Manhattan CB8)
 Carlina Rivera (Manhattan CB3)
 Helen Rosenthal (Manhattan CB7)
 Leslie Wyche (Manhattan CB9 & CB11)

See also 
 Government of New York City
 List of Manhattan neighborhoods
 New York City Council
 Borough president
 Borough boards of New York City

References

External links 
 Manhattan Community Boards
 BoardStat from BetaNYC
 Manhattan community board application

 
Community Boards of Manhattan
Urban planning in New York City